Fleury Di Nallo (born 20 April 1943) is a French former professional footballer who played as a striker. One of the best forwards in the Division 1 in the 1960s and 1970s, he is the top scorer in the history of Lyon, where he played fourteen years.

Career 
Nicknamed le petit prince de Gerland by the Lyon fans, Di Nallo played 489 games and scored 222 goals for the club. In total, he scored 187 goals in the French Division 1, 182 with Lyon.

In his first full season with Lyon, he scored 21 goals in 23 league games, including three hat-tricks and four goals in six Coupe de France matches. He was capped 10 times for France between 1962 and 1971, scoring twice on his international debut in a defeat against Hungary (2–3).

From 2005 to 2008, he was coach of AS Misérieux Trévoux club. In October 2008, he signed with FC Corbas as sports adviser.

Honours
Lyon
 French Cup: 1964, 1967, 1973

External links and references
 
 
 Fleury Di Nallo profile at pari-et-gagne.com

1943 births
Living people
French footballers
Footballers from Lyon
Association football forwards
France international footballers
Ligue 1 players
Olympique Lyonnais players
Red Star F.C. players
Montpellier HSC players